Nikolai Ilyich Martynyuk (22 April 1934 – 10 April 2021) was an officer of the  Soviet Navy. He rose to command his own vessels, reaching the rank of vice admiral in 1985, and serving as First Deputy Chief of Staff of the Pacific Fleet between 1984 and 1991.

Naval career
He attended the Pacific Higher Naval School, graduating with honours in 1956. Between 1956 and 1966 he served on various surface ships of the Kamchatka Flotilla, rising through the ranks from commander of the ship's control group, and weapons commander on the SKR-55 of the 86th separate battalion of patrol ships, to commanding two minesweepers, including the BTShch-91 and the Project 30bis destroyer Bezboyaznenny. He remained with the fleet until 1969, during which time he commanded the Project 57bis destroyer Derzkiy.

Martynyuk undertook further studies between 1969 and 1971, this time at the A. A. Grechko Naval Academy, graduating with honours. In 1971 he joined the Pacific Fleet, where he would spend the rest of his naval career. While serving with the fleet he rose from the post of chief of staff of the 82nd brigade of reserve ships, through two years in command of the 175th missile ship brigade, to become the fleet's First Deputy Chief of Staff in summer 1984. The squadron at this time was one of the most powerful in the navy, consisting of some of its most modern ships. In 1985 he was promoted to the rank of vice admiral, and retired in 1991.

Political career and later life
Shortly before retiring from the navy, Martynyuk began a career in politics in the Russian Far East. He was elected a deputy of Vladivostok City Council for the 149th constituency in 1990, and served until 1993. He was elected chairman for the defence commission, and was a member of the Presidium of the Council between 1990 and 1992. Over the course of his life he was awarded the Order of the Red Star, and the Order "For Service to the Homeland in the Armed Forces of the USSR" Third Class, and various medals.

Martynyuk died in Vladivostok on 10 April 2021 at the age of 86, after a serious illness. He was buried in the city's .

References

1934 births
2021 deaths
N. G. Kuznetsov Naval Academy alumni
People from Primorsky Krai
Soviet admirals
Recipients of the Order of the Red Star
Recipients of the Order "For Service to the Homeland in the Armed Forces of the USSR", 3rd class